is a platform game developed and published by Wolf Team for the Sega Genesis game console in 1991. It is the first in a trilogy of games, which includes Earnest Evans and Anett Futatabi.

Gameplay
El Viento is a platform game. The player has access to an endless supply of bladed boomerangs and eventually up to five spell attacks. Each level ends in a fight against a stage boss.

Plot
The game shares the same fictional universe with Earnest Evans, and happens several years later. It also features many references to H. P. Lovecraft's Cthulhu Mythos. The game takes place in New York City during the late 1920s, when cult leader Henry, the gangster Al Capone (Vincente DeMarcoto in the American localization), and a sorceress named Restiana plot to awaken the ancient and malevolent god Hastur. There are some people that have descended from Hastur's ancient bloodline, one of which is the young Peruvian sorceress, Annet Myer. With some assistance from Earnest Evans, Annet attempts to stop the cult from resurrecting Hastur using the very spells of this bloodline.

Reception
El Viento was given mixed but mostly positive reviews, including being rated 93% by Joystick in France, 66% by Super Play, and 68% by Video Games in Germany. Damian Butt from Sega Pro gave it a score of 89%: "With super fast graphics and brutal gameplay, El Viento will take your breath away." On the other hand, Entertainment Weekly gave it a D−, opining that "only the game's amusing historical anachronisms-like denim-clad blond bikers wielding scimitars-save it from rating as a total failure." 

Retrospectively, Rodger Swan from Sega-16 gave this "great and challenging action game" an 8 out of 10 in spite of being at times "far too difficult," stating: "It may not have as pretty graphics or music as the Valis titles, but it has some really fast game play that gets players in the mood for action. This is a game that I encourage all action fans to pick up, and fans of Valis will appreciate the sense of speed!" According to Kurt Kalata of Hardcore Gaming 101, "overall, it's a bit of a sloppy game, with haphazard action and iffy level design, but the fast pace and overall craziness make this worth looking into, especially since it's one of Wolf Team's better titles."

References

External links

El Viento at GameFAQs

1991 video games
Adventures of Earnest Evans and Annet Myer
Cthulhu Mythos video games
Magical girl video games
Side-scrolling platform games
Sega Genesis games
Sega Genesis-only games
Telenet Japan games
Video games scored by Motoi Sakuraba
Video games developed in Japan
Video games featuring female protagonists
Video games set in the 1920s
Video games set in Chicago
Wolf Team games
Single-player video games